Mark Venus (born 6 April 1967) is an English football coach and former player. He works as assistant head coach of Sunderland. As a player, he spent the majority of his career with Wolverhampton Wanderers and Ipswich Town. As a coach, he has served as an assistant manager to Tony Mowbray at Hibernian, West Bromwich Albion, Celtic, Middlesbrough and Blackburn

Playing career
His career started with his hometown team of Hartlepool United where he signed as a youngster in 1985. After a stay at Leicester City, he signed in 1987 for Wolverhampton Wanderers. Over nearly a decade at Molineux, Venus was an integral part of the club's resurrection after bankruptcy. Playing left back and, occasionally in his preferred position of central defence, Venus helped Wolves to Divisions Four and Three championships.

He joined Ipswich Town in 1997 after being exchanged for Steve Sedgley. With Ipswich Town he won the 1999–2000 First Division play-offs, and then finished 5th in the Premier League, qualifying for the UEFA Cup. Ipswich were relegated in 2001–02, but Venus picked up the club's Player of the Year award. He was given a free transfer by Ipswich Town manager Joe Royle at the end of 2002–03.

Whilst playing for Cambridge United in 2003–04, he fell out with the club and played the rest of that season on loan to Dagenham & Redbridge.

Coaching career
Venus was hired as Hibernian assistant manager by his former Ipswich Town teammate Tony Mowbray in 2004. Venus also registered as a player for Hibs, but played in only one match before ending his playing career. Their contracts were extended in September 2006.

Venus returned to the West Midlands in October 2006 by following Mowbray to West Bromwich Albion. Their first game in charge was a Black Country derby against Wolves, where Venus had spent the bulk of his playing career. They had their contract extended until June 20111 in February 2008.

Venus was appointed Celtic assistant manager on 16 June 2009, again following Mowbray. After Mowbray was sacked as Celtic manager in March 2010, Venus and Peter Grant also left the club.

Venus was appointed assistant manager of Middlesbrough on 26 October 2010, working again with Mowbray. After Mowbray was sacked by Middlesbrough in October 2013, Venus was made caretaker manager. Middlesbrough chairman Steve Gibson commented that Venus was on the shortlist of candidates to be the next permanent manager. On 25 October he led Middlesbrough to a 4–0 win over Doncaster Rovers. Mark Venus' tenure as caretaker manager came to an end on 13 November when Aitor Karanka was appointed as the new Middlesbrough head coach.

Venus joined Coventry City in June 2015 as technical director. After the resignation of Tony Mowbray on 29 September 2016 he was made caretaker manager.

Personal life 
Two medals awarded to Venus were stolen during a break-in at his house in the Morningside area of Edinburgh on 29 December 2010.

Managerial statistics

Honours
Ipswich Town
Football League First Division play-offs: 2000

Individual
Wolverhampton Wanderers Player of the Year: 1989–90
PFA Team of the Year: 1998–99 First Division
Ipswich Town Player of the Year: 2001–02

References

External links

1967 births
Living people
Footballers from Hartlepool
English footballers
Association football defenders
Premier League players
English Football League players
Hartlepool United F.C. players
Leicester City F.C. players
Wolverhampton Wanderers F.C. players
Ipswich Town F.C. players
Cambridge United F.C. players
Dagenham & Redbridge F.C. players
Hibernian F.C. players
Hibernian F.C. non-playing staff
Celtic F.C. non-playing staff
Middlesbrough F.C. non-playing staff
Coventry City F.C. non-playing staff
Coventry City F.C. managers
Coventry City F.C. directors and chairmen
Blackburn Rovers F.C. non-playing staff
Sunderland A.F.C. non-playing staff 
English football managers